Ignacio José Gutiérrez Castillo (born April 29, 1976 in Constitución) is a Chilean journalist and television presenter.

Television

Other websites 
 

1976 births
People from Maule Region
Living people
Chilean journalists
Male journalists
Chilean television presenters
Chilean LGBT journalists
Chilean television personalities